The Next Sikkim Legislative Assembly elections is scheduled to be held on or before April 2024 to elect the 32 members of the 10th Legislative Assembly.

Background 
The tenure of Sikkim Legislative Assembly is scheduled to end on 2 June 2024. The previous assembly elections were held in April 2019. After the election, Sikkim Krantikari Morcha formed the state government, with Prem Singh Tamang becoming the Chief Minister.

Schedule

Parties and alliances







See also 

 Elections in Sikkim
 2024 elections in India

References 

State Assembly elections in Sikkim
2020s in Sikkim
Future elections in India